Bödvar Bjarki, meaning 'Warlike Little-Bear', is the hero appearing in tales of Hrólfr Kraki in the Hrólfs saga kraka, in the Latin epitome to the lost Skjöldunga saga, and as Biarco in Saxo Grammaticus' Gesta Danorum.

Legend
Bjarki's father, Björn (which means "bear"), was the son of Hring, a King in Norway. After Björn's mother died, Hring married a much younger Sámi woman called Hvit. Björn became a tall, strong young man, and he and a young woman named Bera were in love.

At a time when Hring was away, Hvit tried to seduce Björn, but he rejected her. She cast a spell that made him a bear by day and a man only by night. He fled to the area near Bera's father's farm, where he lived by killing livestock, and he brought Bera to live with him. Urged by Hvit, the king took his hunters to kill the bear. Björn foresaw his death and told Bera that she was pregnant, telling her what to do after his death. The hunters killed him, and Bera went to the celebration, where his carcass was cooked. Despite his instruction not to eat any of the meat, Hvit pressured her into eating one bite.

Bera had triplets, all boys. The first to be born, Elgfróði (Elk-Frodi), had the body of a Eurasian elk from the waist down. The second, Thorir, had the feet of a hound. Bödvar Bjarki was the third, and he was normal.

All three grew exceptionally big and strong. At the age of twelve, Frodi got into trouble for fights in which he injured people and killed one of the king's men, and he left to become a robber. Thorir became the king of Gautland (Geatland). Bjarki, the last to leave his mother, killed Hvit in revenge for his father's death. When Hring died, Bjarki succeeded him.

After a time, he left the court and visited Elk-Froði, not revealing his identity. Frodi challenged him to wrestle. Bjarki did much better than Frodi expected, but when Frodi recognized him, he thought Bjarki was still not strong enough, so he had Bjarki drink some of his blood, which increased his strength greatly.

On Frodi's advice, Bjarki visited Thorir in Gautland and then went to King Hrolf Kraki's court at Lejre in Denmark. Newly arrived, he saved a weak young thrall named Hott from bullying. That night he fought and killed a monster that had killed many of the king's warriors. He took Hott out to the carcass and forced him to drink the monster's blood, making him strong and brave. They set up the carcass as if it were alive, and in the morning Hott pretended to kill it. As a reward the king gave him his gold-hilted sword and changed his name to Hjalti (meaning "hilt").

One of Hrolf's berserker warriors challenged Bjarki. Bjarki killed him and expelled his berserker companions. From then on he was considered Denmark's greatest champion. He became a trusted adviser of the king as well as a leader in battle, and married the king's daughter, Drifa. He advised Hrolf to go to Uppsala to reclaim the treasure of Hrolf's father from King Adils, bringing about the well-known episode in which Hrolf and his men scattered the treasure to slow their pursuers and Hrolf humiliated Adils. On the way back, Hrolf angered a man who he later realized was Odin in disguise. Bjarki advised Hrolf to avoid war from then on, since he had lost the favor of the god of victory.

When Hrolf's half-sister and her husband rebelled and attacked Lejre, Bjarki stayed in the hall in a trance. Meanwhile, a monstrous bear did heavy damage to the rebels' army. Hjalti, disturbed that Bjarki was not fighting, went to the hall and roused him. But the bear was Bjarki's spirit or fetch, and disappeared. Bjarki went out to fight, but not as effectively as the bear. The rebels overwhelmed the defenders and killed Hrolf, Bjarki, and all Hrolf's other warriors.

Bjarkamál

The Old Norse poem Bjarkamál (of which only a few stanzas are preserved but which Saxo Grammaticus presents in the form of a florid Latin paraphrase) is understood as a dialogue between Bödvar Bjarki and Hjalti which begins with Hjalti again and again urging Bödvar to awake and fight for King Hrólf in this last battle in which they are doomed to defeat. As mentioned above, this caused Bjarki's spirit-bear to disappear. As Bjarki puts it on awakening, "You have not been so helpful to the king by this action of yours as you think".

Beowulf, folk-tales, and The Hobbit

Some think Bjarki and the hero Beowulf in the Old English poem Beowulf were originally the same personage, and others instead accept some kinship between the two,  perhaps pointing to the same distant source. Unlike Beowulf, Bjarki is a shapeshifter, and he is also said to have been Norwegian, which may be explained by the fact that his story was written by Icelandic authors who were mostly of Norwegian descent.

However, his brother was the king of Geatland and, like Beowulf, Bǫðvarr Bjarki arrived in Denmark from Geatland. Moreover, his killing of the monster that has been terrorizing the court at Yule for two years is comparable to Beowulf's killing of Grendel. The name "Beowulf" may have originally meant "bee-wolf", a kenning for "bear", though other etymologies have been proposed.

Like Beowulf, Bödvar Bjarki has been linked to the folktales categorized as the Bear's Son Tale.

Tom Shippey has said that the character of Beorn in The Hobbit, by J. R. R. Tolkien, has "a very close analogue" in Bödvar Bjarki.

See also

References

Further reading
F. Klauber ed., Beowulf and the Fight at Finnsburg (Boston 1950) p. xiiiff.

Heroes in Norse myths and legends
Shapeshifting
Mythological bears
Year of birth unknown
Year of death unknown